Griefcast is a British podcast about grief and loss. Hosted by comic and actor Cariad Lloyd, the podcasts feature hour-long conversations about grief and bereavement with people who have experienced the death of loved ones. Lloyd asks guests "Who are we remembering today?" at the start of each episode. 

Many of the guests on Griefcast are also comics; in a 2018 interview  Lloyd said: "If you have a comic sensibility, you do this at any serious event. You break awkwardness with jokes. It’s a way of coping. You have a breath of laughter when, for a moment, you forget that someone you love is dying. It’s like coming up for air.” 

Griefcast premiered in 2016 and was one of the top podcasts on iTunes within six months. It has won several awards, including Best Entertainment Podcast and Podcast of the Year at the British Podcast Awards and an ARIA Award for Best Podcast. In a 2018 article in FT, Fiona Sturges wrote: "If justification were needed for the existence of podcasts, this show is it."

References

External links

British podcasts
Interview podcasts